Mike Lünsmann (born 23 November 1969 in Berlin) is a retired German footballer who made over 200 appearances for Hertha BSC.

References

External links 
 

1969 births
Living people
Footballers from Berlin
German footballers
Association football forwards
Bundesliga players
2. Bundesliga players
Hertha BSC players
Hertha BSC II players
Rot Weiss Ahlen players
FC Sachsen Leipzig players
Tennis Borussia Berlin players
SV Yeşilyurt players